Peter B. Collins (born 1953) is an American talk radio host, voiceover talent, entrepreneur, and media consultant based near San Francisco, California, United States.

He has been a talk show host for several radio stations, and known for being a liberal in a genre dominated by conservatives. He also hosted a program on food and wine. From 2005 to 2009, he hosted The Peter B. Collins Show, a syndicated, progressive, radio talk show based at KRXA in Monterey, California. From 2009 to 2020, he hosted his show on the internet, via listener-supported podcasts. Occasionally, Collins substitute-hosted on KGO-AM in San Francisco. He retired at the end of 2020.

Early life and education 
Collins grew up in Cincinnati, Ohio, where he attended St. Xavier High School. He went to college at Northwestern University in Chicago, where he broke into in radio broadcasting. He moved to the Bay Area in 1976.

Career 
Collins got his start with a nightly talk show at ABC-owned WLS-FM in Chicago. This was during the era of the Watergate scandal, which Collins was discussing at the age of 19.  

In 1979, he moved to co-owned KGO in San Francisco, California. KCBS-FM hired him in 1980, and he worked part-time for both stations for a while. When KCBS-FM flip to album rock KRQR, he was promoted to morning host. He gave fellow host Steven Seaweed the nickname "The Weed Man," which became his best-known moniker for more than 30 years. 

In 1989, Collins returned to talk radio with an afternoon program on KNBR. He also co-hosted a daily one-hour food and wine show on KNBR, featuring many acclaimed winemakers and chefs.  

When rival station KSFO adopted a talk format in 1993, it hired Collins for the "afternoon drive" time slot. Their billboard campaign endorsed his show as "a little to the left," playing on his politics and the station's dial position (560 AM). ABC Radio, Disney, also owner of KGO, purchased KSFO in 1994. It converted the station to the first all-conservative talk format and dropped Collins' show.  

Since leaving KSFO, Collins has produced other radio shows, such as Childhood Matters on KISQ, Street Soldiers on KMEL, Conversations on the Coast with Jim Foster on KFRC and Nurse Talk on AM 960. He also began working as a political media consultant, working on 28 political campaigns for clients including Nancy Pelosi, Tom Campbell and Pete McCloskey; he’s currently working to elect Carl Tennenbaum as Sheriff of Sonoma County. Collins has performed as a voice-over artist for hundreds of radio and TV commercials, as well as station promos for television and radio, non-broadcast sales and training programs, CD-ROMs and voice mail systems. He hosted of Behind the Wheel, a new-car review show that airs on radio stations and on the Internet from 1998 to 2008.  

In May 2003, Collins returned to talk radio as host of All-American Talk Radio, which was heard on I.E. America Radio Network and SIRIUS Left, as well as via webcast. Subscribers paid to hear it through SIRIUS. Unlike some conservative talk show hosts, Collins did not screen callers to ensure that people of other opinions were excluded. He attracted and spoke with callers from a range of political backgrounds.  

In 2005, Collins and other investors purchased KRXA, based in Monterey, California.  He started to broadcast the nationally syndicated Peter B. Collins Show that year, which also had a politically progressive slant to its content. His show stopped being aired on KRXA on March 20, 2009. KRXA was sold in 2013.

Other activities 
Since 1986, Collins has served as board president of the Freedom Foundation, a nonprofit based at San Quentin Prison.  It provides legal and investigative assistance to inmates in California who claim to have been wrongfully convicted and seek reviews of their cases. Collins was officer of the San Francisco Local of the American Federation of TV and Radio Artists (SAG-AFTRA), from 1983 to 2005. He also served on AFTRA's national board from 1993 to 2005.

He is a member of the Global Advisory Board of Restorative Justice International, which advocates worldwide for victim-offender reconciliation.  Collins is also a member of Sacramento Seminar, a group of Bay Area political veterans—former officeholders, candidates, staffers and campaign operatives. Collins was named to the Bay Area Radio Hall of Fame in 2021.

Personal life 
He is an avid skier and sailor, and is a partner in a sailboat on San Francisco Bay.

References

External links
Official Website, The Peter Collins Show, includes archives of podcasts, available for free from 2009 to June 2021
KRXA 540 website
"Collins proving left-leaning radio host can succeed", San Francisco Chronicle, 17 October 2003
"Peter B. Collins To Launch Radio Free America", Bay Area Radio Digest
Archives of the Peter B. Collins Show, 2006 to 2009, White Rose Society

1954 births
Living people
American businesspeople
American talk radio hosts
Northwestern University alumni
Radio personalities from Cincinnati
People from Marin County, California
St. Xavier High School (Ohio) alumni